Julian Howarth  is a British sound mixer and recordist.

Julian was nominated for an Academy Award in the category Best Sound for the film Avatar: The Way of Water.

Career
Julian holds degrees of BSc (Hons) Physics from Liverpool University. Before transitioning to film and television, he began his career in music and theater.

Selected filmography
Sound mixer
 2022 – Avatar: The Way of Water
 2022 – Obi-Wan Kenobi
 2022 – Morbius
 2021 – Encounter
 2021 – Malignant
 2021 – Wrath of Man
 2019 – Ad Astra
 2019 – The Curse of La Llorona
 2019 – Alita: Battle Angel
 2017 – Bright

Awards and nominations

References

External links
 

Living people
British sound artists
British sound editors
Production sound mixers
British audio engineers
Date of birth missing (living people)